Miya Muqi (born 20 May 1987), professional name for Mu Qimiya, is a Chinese actress who has appeared in films such as Kung Fu Yoga (2017), Tomb Robber (2014) and The Monkey King 2 (2016).

Biography
Miya Muqi began modeling at the age of 14 years and is a professional Yoga instructor. She began her acting career in Tomb Robber, which starred Michael Tong. She was praised as "the most beautiful Asian Yoga Coach". Miya won the award for "Favorite Lady" at the Tencent automobile exhibition Auto Show 2010.

In addition to being a Yoga and dance instructor she is also a teacher of taekwondo. Along with Jackie Chan and other cast members of Kung Fu Yoga, Miya appeared on The Kapil Sharma Show to promote the movie.

Yoga promotion ambassador
Miya Muqi, known as Goddess of Yoga in Yunnan Province, was granted the position of promotional brand ambassador of yoga for 2016 China (Kunming)–India Yoga Conference.

Filmography

Films 

2021 || ''[[ladki(film)||  ||  Mi Ya ||

Television

Variety show

References

External links

 
 Miya Muqi at douban.com
 Miya Muqi at chinesemov.com

1987 births
Living people
21st-century Chinese actresses
Chinese film actresses
Chinese television actresses
Yi people